Nøst Island is an island less than  long,  west-southwest of Evans Island in the south part of Holme Bay. Mapped by Norwegian cartographers from aerial photographs taken by the Lars Christensen Expedition, 1936–37, and called by them Nøstet (the boatshed).

See also 
 List of Antarctic and sub-Antarctic islands

Islands of Mac. Robertson Land